Afrikaners are a South African ethnic group descended from predominantly Dutch immigrants first arriving at the Cape of Good Hope in 1652. They traditionally dominated South Africa's politics and commercial agricultural sector prior to 1994. Afrikaans, South Africa's third most widely spoken home language, evolved as the mother tongue of Afrikaners and most Cape Coloureds. It originated from the Dutch vernacular of South Holland, incorporating words brought from the Dutch East Indies (now Indonesia) and Madagascar by slaves. Afrikaners make up approximately 5.2% of the total South African population, based upon the number of White South Africans who speak Afrikaans as a first language in the South African National Census of 2011.

The arrival of Portuguese explorer Vasco da Gama at Calicut, India, in 1498 opened a gateway of free access to Asia from Western Europe around the Cape of Good Hope; however, it also necessitated the founding and safeguarding of trade stations in the East. The Portuguese landed in Mossel Bay in 1500, explored Table Bay two years later, and by 1510 had started raiding inland. As the volume of traffic rounding the Cape increased, VOC recognised its natural harbour as an ideal watering point for the long voyage around Africa to the Orient and established a victualling station there in 1652. VOC officials did not favour the permanent settlement of Europeans in their trading empire, although during the 140 years of Dutch rule many VOC servants retired or were discharged and remained as private citizens. Furthermore, the exigencies of supplying local garrisons and passing fleets compelled the administration to confer free status upon employees and oblige them to become independent farmers.

Encouraged by the success of this experiment, the Company extended free passage from 1685 to 1707 for Dutch wishing to settle at the Cape. In 1688, it sponsored the settlement of 200 French Huguenot refugees forced into exile by the Edict of Fontainebleau. The terms under which the Huguenots agreed to immigrate were the same offered to other VOC subjects, including free passage and requisite farm equipment on credit. Prior attempts at cultivating vineyards or exploiting olive groves for fruit had been unsuccessful, and it was hoped that Huguenot colonists accustomed to Mediterranean agriculture could succeed where the Dutch had failed. They were augmented by VOC soldiers returning from Asia, predominantly Germans channeled into Amsterdam by the company's extensive recruitment network and thence overseas. Despite their diverse nationalities, the colonists used a common language and adopted similar attitudes towards politics. The attributes they shared came to serve as a basis for the evolution of Afrikaner identity and consciousness.

In 1914, the National Party was founded to promote Afrikaner economic interests and sever South Africa's ties to the United Kingdom. Rising to prominence by winning the 1948 general election, it was also noted for enforcing a harsh policy of racial segregation (apartheid) while simultaneously declaring South Africa a republic in 1961 and withdrawing from the British Commonwealth. The National Party was voted out in 1994 following decades of domestic unrest and international sanctions that resulted in bilateral negotiations to end apartheid and South Africa's first multiracial election held under a universal franchise.

Nomenclature
Their original progenitors, especially in paternal lines, also included smaller numbers of Flemish, French Huguenot, German, Danish, Norwegian, and Swedish immigrants. Historically, the terms "" and "" have both been used to describe white Afrikaans-speakers as a group; neither is particularly objectionable, but "Afrikaner" has been considered a more appropriate term.

By the late nineteenth century, the term was in common usage in both the Boer republics and in the Cape Colony. At one time, burghers denoted Cape Dutch: those settlers who were influential in the administration, able to participate in urban affairs, and did so regularly. Boers often referred to the settled ethnic European farmers or to nomadic cattle-herders. During the Batavian Republic of 1795–1806,  ('citizen') was popularised among Dutch communities both at home and abroad as a popular revolutionary form of address. In South Africa, it remained in use as late as the Second Boer War of 1899–1902.

The first recorded instance of a colonist identifying as an Afrikaner occurred in March 1707, during a disturbance in Stellenbosch. When the magistrate, Johannes Starrenburg, ordered an unruly crowd to desist, a young white man named Hendrik Biebouw retorted, "" ("I will not leave, I am an African – even if the magistrate were to beat me to death, or put me in jail, I shall not be, nor will I stay, silent!"). Biebouw was flogged for his insolence and later banished to Batavia (present-day Jakarta in Indonesia). The word Afrikaner is thought to have first been used to classify Cape Coloureds, or other groups of mixed-race ancestry. Biebouw had numerous "half-caste" (mixed race) siblings and may have identified with Coloureds socially. The growing use of the term appeared to express the rise of a new identity for white South Africans, suggesting for the first time a group identification with the Cape Colony rather than with an ancestral homeland in Europe.

Afrikaner culture and people are also commonly referred to as the Afrikaans or Afrikaans people.

Population

1691 estimates

VOC initially had no intention of establishing a permanent European settlement at the Cape of Good Hope; until 1657 it devoted as little attention as possible to the development or administration of the Dutch Cape Colony. From the VOC's perspective, there was little financial incentive to regard the region as anything more than the site of a strategic victualing centre. Furthermore, the Cape was unpopular among VOC employees, who regarded it as a barren and insignificant outpost with little opportunity for advancement.

A small number of longtime VOC employees who had been instrumental in the colony's founding and its first five years of existence, however, expressed interest in applying for grants of land, with the objective of retiring at the Cape as farmers. The  were to be of Dutch birth (although exceptions were made for some Germans), married, "of good character", and had to undertake to spend at least twenty years in Southern Africa. In March 1657, when the first  started receiving their farms, the white population of the Cape was only about 134. Although the soil and climate in Cape Town were suitable for farming, willing immigrants remained in short supply and included a number of orphans, refugees, and foreigners accordingly. From 1688 onward the Cape attracted some French Huguenots, most of them refugees from the protracted conflict between Protestants and Catholics in France.

South Africa's white population in 1691 has been described as the Afrikaner "parent stock", as no significant effort was made to secure more colonist families after the dawn of the 18th century, and a majority of Afrikaners are descended from progenitors who arrived prior to 1700 in general and the late 1600s in particular. Although some two-thirds of this figure were Dutch-speaking Hollanders, there were at least 150 Huguenots and a nearly equal number of Low German speakers. Also represented in smaller numbers were Swedes, Danes, and Belgians.

1754 estimates
In 1754, Cape governor Ryk Tulbagh conducted a census of his non-indigenous subjects. White  - now outnumbered by slaves brought from West Africa, Mozambique, Madagascar and the Dutch East Indies - only totaled about 6,000.

1806 estimates
Following the defeat and collapse of the Dutch Republic during Joseph Souham's Flanders Campaign, William V, Prince of Orange escaped to the United Kingdom and appealed to the British to occupy his colonial possessions until he was restored. Holland's administration was never effectively reestablished; upon a new outbreak of hostilities with France expeditionary forces led by Sir David Baird, 1st Baronet finally permanently imposed British rule when they defeated Cape governor Jan Willem Janssens in 1806.

At the onset of Cape Town's annexation to the British Empire, the original Afrikaners numbered 26,720 – or 36% of the colony's population.

1936 Census 
The South African census of 1936 gave the following breakdown of language speakers of European origin.

1960 Census
The South African census of 1960 was the final census undertaken in the Union of South Africa. Ethno-linguistic status of some 15,994,181 South African citizens was projected by various sources through sampling language, religion and race. At least 1.6 million South Africans represented white Afrikaans speakers, or 10% of the total population. They also constituted 9.3% of the population in neighbouring South West Africa.

1985 Census
According to the South African census of 1985, there were 2,581,080 white Afrikaans speakers then residing in the country, or about 9.4% of the total population.

1996 Census
The South African National Census of 1996 was the first census conducted in post-apartheid South Africa. It was calculated on census day and reported a population of 2,558,956 white Afrikaans speakers. The census noted that Afrikaners represented the eighth largest ethnic group in the country, or 6.3% of the total population. Even after the end of Apartheid the ethnic group only fell by 25,000 people.

2001 Census
The South African National Census of 2001 was the second census conducted in post-apartheid South Africa. It was calculated on 9 October and reported a population of 2,576,184 white Afrikaans speakers. The census noted that Afrikaners represented the eighth largest ethnic group in the country, or 5.7% of the total population.

Distribution

Afrikaners make up approximately 58% of South Africa's white population, based on language used in the home. English speakers – an ethnically diverse group – account for closer to 37%. As in Canada or the United States, most modern European immigrants elect to learn English and are likelier to identify with those descended from British colonials of the nineteenth century. Aside from coastal pockets in the Eastern Cape and KwaZulu-Natal they remain heavily outnumbered by those of Afrikaans origin.

2011 Census
The South African National Census of 2011 counted 2,710,461 white South Africans who speak Afrikaans as a first language, or approximately 5.23% of the total South African population. The census also showed an increase of 5.21% in Afrikaner population compared to the previous, 2001 census.

History

Early Dutch settlement

The earliest Afrikaner communities in South Africa were formed at the Cape of Good Hope, mainly through the introduction of Dutch colonists, French Huguenot refugees and erstwhile servants of the VOC. Their concept of being rooted in Africa—as opposed to the company's expatriate officialdom—did not find widespread expression until the late eighteenth century.

It is to the ambitions of Prince Henry the Navigator that historians attribute the discovery of the Cape as a settling ground for Europeans. In 1424, Henry and Fernando de Castro besieged the Canary Islands, under the impression that they might be of use to further Portuguese expeditions around Africa's coast. Although this attempt was unsuccessful, Portugal's continued interest in the continent made possible the later voyages of Bartholomew Diaz in 1487 and Vasco de Gama ten years later. Diaz made known to the world a "Cape of Storms", rechristened "Good Hope" by John II. As it was desirable to take formal possession of this territory, the Portuguese erected a stone cross in Algoa Bay. Da Gama and his successors, however, did not take kindly to the notion, especially following a skirmish with the Khoikhoi in 1497, when one of his admirals was wounded.

After the British East India Company was founded in 1599, London merchants began to take advantage of the route to India by the Cape. James Lancaster, who had visited Robben Island some years earlier, anchored in Table Bay in 1601. By 1614, the British had planted a penal colony on the site, and in 1621 two Englishmen claimed Table Bay on behalf of King James I, but this action was not ratified. They eventually settled on Saint Helena as an alternative port of refuge.

Due to the value of the spice trade between Europe and their outposts in the East Indies, Dutch ships began to call sporadically at the Cape in search of provisions after 1598. In 1601, a Captain Paul van Corniden came ashore at St. Sebastion's Bay near Overberg. He discovered a small inlet which he named  ('Meat Bay'), after the cattle trade, and another  ('Fish Bay') after the abundance of fish. Not long afterwards, Admiral Joris van Spilbergen reported catching penguins and sheep on Robben Island.

In 1648, Dutch sailors Leendert Jansz and Nicholas Proot had been shipwrecked in Table Bay and marooned for five months until picked up by a returning ship. During this period they established friendly relations with the locals, who sold them sheep, cattle, and vegetables. Both men presented a report advocating the Table valley as a fort and garden for the VOC fleets.

Under recommendation from Jan van Riebeeck, the Heeren XVII authorised the establishment of a fort at the Cape, and this the more hurriedly to preempt any further imperial maneuvers by Britain, France or Portugal. Van Riebeeck, his family and seventy to eighty VOC personnel arrived there on 6 April 1652 after a journey of three and a half months. Their immediate task was the establishment of some gardens, "taking for this purpose all the best and richest ground"; following this they were instructed to conduct a survey to determine the best pastureland for the grazing of cattle. By 15 May, they had nearly completed construction on the Castle of Good Hope, which was to be an easily defensible victualing station serving Dutch ships plying the Indian Ocean. Dutch sailors appreciated the mild climate at the Cape, which allowed them to recuperate from their protracted periods of service in the tropical humidity of Southeast Asia. VOC fleets bearing cargo from the "Orient" anchored in the Cape for a month, usually from March or April, when they were resupplied with water and provisions prior to completing their return voyage to the Netherlands.

In extent the new refreshment post was to be kept as confined as possible to reduce administrative expense. Residents would associate amiably with the natives for the sake of livestock trade, but otherwise keep to themselves and their task of becoming self-sufficient. As the VOC's primary goal was merchant enterprise, particularly its shipping network traversing the Atlantic and Indian Oceans between the Netherlands and various ports in Asia, most of its territories consisted of coastal forts, factories, and isolated trading posts dependent entirely on indigenous host states. The exercise of Dutch sovereignty, as well the large scale settlement of Dutch colonists, was therefore extremely limited at these sites.

The VOC operated under a strict corporate hierarchy which allowed it to formally assign classifications to those whom it determined fell within its legal purview. The legal classifications imposed upon every individual in the Company possessions determined their position in society and conferred restraints upon their actions. VOC ordinances made a clear distinction between the "bonded" period of service, and the period of "freedom" that began once an employment contract ended. Fairly strict conditions were levied on those who aspired to become  at the Cape of Good Hope. They had to be married Dutch citizens who were regarded as being "of good character" by the VOC and committed to at least twenty years' residence in South Africa. Reflecting the multi-national nature of the workforce of the early modern trading companies, some foreigners, particularly Germans, were open to consideration as well. If their application for  status was successful, the Company granted them plots of farmland of thirteen and a half morgen (equal to ), which were tax exempt for twelve years. They were also loaned tools and seeds. Each year their harvest was to be sold exclusively to the VOC at fixed prices. They were forbidden from growing tobacco, producing vegetables for any purpose other than personal consumption, or purchasing cattle from the native Khoikhoi at rates which differed from those set by the VOC.

Around March 1657, Rijcklof van Goens, a senior VOC officer appointed as commissioner to the fledgling Dutch Cape Colony, ordered Jan van Riebeeck to help more employees succeed as  so the company could save on their wages. A ship's carpenter was granted a tract of forest, from which he was permitted to sell timber, and one miller from Holland opened his own water-operated corn mill, the first of its kind in Southern Africa. The colony initially did not do well, and many of the discouraged  returned to VOC service or sought passage back to the Netherlands to pursue other opportunities. There was also an unskilled labour shortage, which the VOC later resolved by bringing slaves from Angola, Madagascar, and the East Indies.

In 1662, van Riebeeck was succeeded by Zacharias Wagenaer as governor of the Cape. When Wagenaer arrived, he observed that many of the unmarried  were beginning to cohabit with their slaves, with the result that 75% of children born to Cape slaves at the time had a Dutch father. Wagenaer's response was to sponsor the immigration of Dutch women to the colony as potential wives for the settlers. Upon the outbreak of the Second Anglo-Dutch War, Wagenaer was perturbed by the British capture of New Amsterdam and attacks on other Dutch outposts in the Americas and on the west African coast. He increased the Cape garrison by about 300 troops and replaced the original earthen fortifications of the Castle of Good Hope with new ones of stone.

In 1672, there were 300 VOC officials, employees, soldiers and sailors at the Cape, compared to only about 64 , 39 of whom were married, with 65 children. By 1687, the number had increased to about 254 , of whom 77 were married, with 231 children. Simon van der Stel, who was appointed governor of the Cape in 1679, reversed the VOC's earlier policy of keeping the colony limited to the confines of the Cape peninsula itself and encouraged Dutch settlement further abroad, resulting in the founding of Stellenbosch. Van der Stel persuaded 30  to settle in Stellenbosch and a few years afterwards the town received its own municipal administration and school. Furthermore, the size of the Cape garrison could be reduced if there were many colonists capable of being called up for militia service as needed.

Following the passage of the Edict of Fontainebleau, the Netherlands served as a major destination for French Huguenot refugees fleeing persecution at home. In April 1688, the VOC agreed to sponsor the resettlement of over 100 Huguenots at the Cape. Smaller numbers of Huguenots gradually arrived over the next decade, and by 1702 the community numbered close to 200. Between 1689 and 1707 they were augmented by additional numbers of Dutch settlers sponsored by the VOC with grants of land and free passage to Africa. Additionally, there were calls from the VOC administration to sponsor the immigration of more German settlers to the Cape, as long as they were Protestant. VOC pamphlets began circulating in German cities exhorting the urban poor to seek their fortune in southern Africa. Despite the increasing diversity of the colonial population, there was a degree of cultural assimilation due to intermarriage, and the almost universal adoption of the Dutch language. The use of other European languages was discouraged by a VOC edict declaring that Dutch should be the exclusive language of administrative record and education. In 1752, French astronomer Nicolas-Louis de Lacaille visited the Cape and observed that the nearly all the third-generation descendants of the original Huguenot and German settlers spoke Dutch as a first language.

Impact of the British occupation of the Cape 

Long before the British annexed the Cape Colony, there were already large Dutch-speaking European settlements in the Cape Peninsula and beyond; by the time British rule became permanent in 1806, these had a population of over 26,000. There were, however, two distinct subgroups in the  population settled under the VOC. The first were itinerant farmers who began to progressively settle further and further inland, seeking better pastures for their livestock and freedom from the VOC's regulations. This community of settlers collectively identified themselves as Boers to describe their agricultural way of life. Their farms were enormous by European standards, as the land was free and relatively underpopulated; they merely had to register them with the VOC, a process that was little more than a formality and became more irrelevant the further the Boers moved inland. The Boers were deeply suspicious of the centralised government and increasing complexities of administration at the Cape; they constantly migrated further from the reaches of the colonial officialdom whenever it attempted to regulate their activities. By the mid-eighteenth century the Boers had penetrated almost a thousand kilometres into South Africa's interior beyond the Cape of Good Hope, at which point they encountered the Xhosa people, who were migrating southwards from the opposite direction. Competition between the two communities over resources on the frontier sparked the Xhosa Wars. Harsh Boer attitudes towards black Africans were permanently shaped by their contact with the Xhosa, which bred insecurity and fear on the frontier.

The second subgroup of the  population became known as the Cape Dutch and remained concentrated in the southwestern Cape and especially the areas closer to Cape Town. They were likelier to be urban dwellers, more educated, and typically maintained greater cultural ties to the Netherlands than the Boers. The Cape Dutch formed the backbone of the colony's market economy and included the small entrepreneurial class. These colonists had vested economic interests in the Cape peninsula and were not inclined to venture inland because of the great difficulties in maintaining contact with a viable market. This was in sharp contrast with the Boers on the frontier, who lived on the margins of the market economy. For this reason the Cape Dutch could not easily participate in migrations to escape the colonial system, and the Boer strategy of social and economic withdrawal was not viable for them. Their response to grievances with the Cape government was to demand political reform and greater representation, a practice that became commonplace under Dutch and subsequently British rule. In 1779, for example, hundreds of Cape  smuggled a petition to Amsterdam demanding an end to VOC corruption and contradictory laws. Unlike the Boers, the contact most Cape Dutch had with black Africans were predominantly peaceful, and their racial attitudes were more paternal than outright hostile.

Meanwhile, the VOC underwent a period of commercial decline beginning in the late eighteenth century which ultimately resulted in its bankruptcy. The company had suffered immense losses to its trade profits as a result of the Fourth Anglo-Dutch War and was heavily in debt with European creditors. In 1794, the Dutch government intervened and assumed formal administration of the Cape Colony. However, events at the Cape were overtaken by turmoil in the Netherlands, which was occupied by Napoleon during the Flanders Campaign. This opened the Cape to French naval fleets. To protect her own prosperous maritime shipping routes, Great Britain occupied the fledgling colony by force until 1803. From 1806 to 1814 the Cape was again governed as a British military dependency, whose sole importance to the Royal Navy was its strategic relation to Indian maritime traffic. The British formally assumed permanent administrative control around 1815, as a result of the Treaty of Paris.

Relations between some of the colonists and the new British administration quickly soured. The British brought more liberal attitudes towards slavery and treatment of the indigenous peoples to the Cape, which were utterly alien to the colonists. Furthermore, they insisted that the Cape Colony finance its own affairs by taxes levied on the white population, an unpopular measure which bred resentment. By 1812, new attorneys-general and judges had been imported from England and many of the preexisting VOC-era institutions abolished, namely the Dutch magistrate system and the only vestige of representative government at the Cape, the  senate. The new judiciary then established circuit courts, which brought colonial authority directly to the frontier. These circuit courts were permitted to try colonists for allegations of abuse of slaves or indentured servants. Most of those tried for these offences were frontier Boers; the charges were usually brought by British missionaries and the courts themselves staffed by unsympathetic and liberal Cape Dutch. The Boers, who perceived most of the charges levelled against them to be flimsy or exaggerated, often refused to answer their court summons.

In 1815, a Cape police unit was dispatched to arrest a Boer for failure to appear in court on charges of cruelty towards indentured Khoisan servants; the colonist fired on the troopers when they entered his property and was killed. The controversy which surrounded the incident led to the abortive Slachter's Nek Rebellion, in which a number of Boers took up arms against the British. British officials retaliated by hanging five Boers for insurrection. In 1828, the Cape governor declared that all native inhabitants but slaves were to have the rights of citizens, in respect of security and property ownership, on parity with whites. This had the effect of further alienating the Boers. Boer resentment of successive British administrators continued to grow throughout the late 1820s and early 1830s, especially with the official imposition of the English language. This replaced Dutch with English as the language used in the Cape's judicial system, putting the Boers at a disadvantage, as most spoke little or no English at all.

Bridling at what they considered an unwarranted intrusion into their way of life, some in the Boer community began to consider selling their farms and venturing deep into South Africa's unmapped interior to preempt further disputes and live completely independent from British rule. From their perspective, the Slachter's Nek Rebellion had demonstrated the futility of an armed uprising against the new order the British had entrenched at the Cape; one result was that the Boers who might have otherwise been inclined to take up arms began preparing for a mass emigration from the colony instead.

The Great Trek 

The  departed the colony in a series of parties, taking with them all their livestock and portable property, as well as slaves, and their dependents. They had the skills to maintain their own wagons and firearms, but remained dependent on equally mobile traders for vital commodities such as gunpowder and sugar. Nevertheless, one of their goals was to sever their ties with the Cape's commercial network by gaining access to foreign traders and ports in east Africa, well beyond the British sphere of influence.

Many of the Boers who participated in the Great Trek had varying motives. While most were driven by some form of disenchantment with British policies, their secondary objectives ranged from seeking more desirable grazing land for their cattle to a desire to retain slaves after the abolition of slavery at the Cape. Only about a fifth of the colony's Dutch-speaking white population at the time participated in the Great Trek. The Dutch Reformed Church, to which most of the Boers belonged, condemned the migration. Despite their hostility towards the British, there were also Boers who chose to remain in the Cape of their own accord. For its part, the distinct Cape Dutch community remained loyal to the British Crown and focused its efforts on building political organisations seeking representative government; its lobbying efforts were partly responsible for the establishment of the Cape Qualified Franchise in 1853.

Important as the Trek was to the formation of Boer ethnic identity, so were the running conflicts with various indigenous groups along the way. One conflict central to the construction of Boer identity occurred with the Zulu in the area of present-day KwaZulu-Natal.

The Boers who entered Natal discovered that the land they wanted came under the authority of the Zulu King , who ruled that part of what subsequently became KwaZulu-Natal. The British had a small port colony (the future Durban) there but were unable to seize the whole of area from the war-ready Zulus, and only kept to the Port of Natal. The Boers found the land safe from the British and sent an un-armed Boer land treaty delegation under Piet Retief on 6 February 1838, to negotiate with the Zulu King. The negotiations went well and a contract between Retief and Dingane was signed.

After the signing, however, Dingane's forces surprised and killed the members of the delegation; a large-scale massacre of the Boers followed: see Weenen massacre. Zulu  ('regiments') attacked Boer encampments in the Drakensberg foothills at what was later called Blaauwkrans and Weenen, killing women and children along with men. (By contrast, in earlier conflicts the  had experienced along the eastern Cape frontier, the Xhosa had refrained from harming women and children.)

A commando of 470 men arrived to help the settlers. On 16 December 1838, the  under the command of Andries Pretorius confronted about 10,000 Zulus at the prepared positions. The Boers had three injuries without any fatalities. Due to the blood of 3,000 slain Zulus that stained the Ncome River, the conflict afterwards became known as the Battle of Blood River.

In present-day South Africa, 16 December remains a celebrated public holiday, initially called "Dingane's Day". After 1952, the holiday was officially recognised and named the Day of the Covenant, changed to Day of the Vow in 1980 (Mackenzie 1999:69)  and, after the abolition of apartheid, to Day of Reconciliation in 1994. The Boers saw their victory at the Battle of Blood River as evidence that they had found divine favour for their exodus from British rule.

Boer republics 

After defeating the Zulu and the recovery of the treaty between Dingane and Retief, the Voortrekkers proclaimed the Natalia Republic. In 1843, Britain annexed Natal and many Boers trekked inwards again.

These areas were mostly unoccupied due to conflicts in the course of the genocidal  wars of the Zulus on the local Basuthu population who used it as summer grazing for their cattle. Some Boers ventured beyond the present-day borders of South Africa, north as far as present-day Zambia and Angola. Others reached the Portuguese colony of Delagoa Bay, later called  and subsequently Maputo – the capital of Mozambique.

They constituted a closed community which rejected integration as well as innovation, became impoverished in the course of several decades, and returned to South West Africa and South Africa in waves. 

The Boers created sovereign states in what is now South Africa:  (the South African Republic) and the Orange Free State were the most prominent and lasted the longest.

The discovery of goldfields awakened British interest in the Boer republics, and the two Boer Wars resulted: The First Boer War (1880–1881) and the Second Boer War (1899–1902). The Boers won the first war and retained their independence. The second ended with British victory and annexation of the Boer areas into the British colonies. The British employed scorched earth tactics and held many Boers in concentration camps as a means to separate commandos from their source of shelter, food and supply. The strategy had its intended effect, but an estimated 27,000 Boers (mainly women and children under sixteen) died in these camps from hunger and disease.

Post Boer War diaspora 

In the 1890s, some Boers trekked into Mashonaland, where they were concentrated at the town of Enkeldoorn, now Chivhu. After the second Boer War, more Boers left South Africa. Starting in 1902 to 1908 a large group of around 650 Afrikaners emigrated to the Patagonia region of Argentina, under the leadership Louis Baumann and the Italian Camillo Ricchiardi (most notably to the towns of Comodoro Rivadavia and Sarmiento), choosing to settle there due to its similarity to the Karoo region of South Africa.

Another group emigrated to British-ruled Kenya, from where most returned to South Africa during the 1930s as a result of warfare there amongst indigenous people. A third group, under the leadership of General Ben Viljoen, emigrated to Chihuahua in northern Mexico and to the states of Arizona, California, New Mexico and Texas in the south-western US. Others migrated to other parts of Africa, including German East Africa (present day Tanzania, mostly near Arusha).

Brazil is the country in Latin America with the largest community of White Afrikaners and White Boers, they mostly live in Southeastern Brazil, the most populous area of the country. In 2020, they numbered 2,895 people.

A relatively large group of Boers settled in Kenya. The first wave of migrants consisted of individual families, followed by larger multiple-family treks. Some had arrived by 1904, as documented by the caption of a newspaper photograph noting a tent town for "some of the early settlers from South Africa" on what became the campus of the University of Nairobi. Probably the first to arrive was W.J. van Breda (1903), followed by John de Waal and Frans Arnoldi at Nakuru (1906). Jannie De Beer's family resided at Athi River, while Ignatius Gouws resided at Solai.

The second wave of migrants is exemplified by Jan Janse van Rensburg's trek. Van Rensburg was inspired by an earlier Boer migrant, Abraham Joubert, who had moved to Nairobi from Arusha in 1906, along with others. When Joubert visited the Transvaal that year, van Rensburg met with him. Sources disagree about whether van Rensburg received guarantees for land from the Governor of the East Africa Protectorate, Sir James Hayes Sadler.

On his return to the Transvaal, van Rensburg recruited about 280 Afrikaners (comprising either 47 or 60 families) to accompany him to British East Africa. The party travelled by five trains to Nakuru.

In 1911, the last of the large trek groups departed for Kenya, when some 60 families from the Orange Free State boarded the SS  in Durban under leadership of C.J. Cloete. But migration dwindled, partly due to the British secretary of state's (then Lord Crewe) cash requirements for immigrants. When the British granted self-government to the former Boer republics of the Transvaal and the Orange Free State in 1906 and 1907, respectively, the pressure for emigration decreased. A trickle of individual  families continued to migrate into the 1950s.

A combination of factors spurred on Boer migration. Some, like van Rensburg and Cloete, had collaborated with the British, or had surrendered during the Boer War. Many migrants were extremely poor and had subsisted on others' property. Collaborators tended to move to British East Africa, while those who had fought to the end (called , "bitter-enders") initially preferred German South West Africa.

One of the best known Boer settlements in the British East Africa Protectorate became established at Eldoret, in the south west of what became known as Kenya in 1920. By 1934, some 700 Boers lived here, near the Ugandan border.

South West Africa 

With the onset of the First World War in 1914, the Allies asked the Union of South Africa to attack the German territory of South West Africa, resulting in the South West Africa Campaign (1914–1915). Armed forces under the leadership of General Louis Botha defeated the German forces, who were unable to put up much resistance to the overwhelming South African forces.

Many Boers, who had little love or respect for Britain, objected to the use of the "children from the concentration camps to attack the anti-British Germans, resulting in the Maritz Rebellion of 1914, which was quickly quelled by the government forces.

Some Boers subsequently moved to South West Africa, which was administered by South Africa until its independence in 1990, after which the country adopted the name Namibia.

Genealogy 
Scholars have traditionally considered Afrikaners to be a homogeneous population of Dutch ancestry, subject to a significant founder effect. This simplistic viewpoint has been challenged by recent studies suggesting multiple uncertainties regarding the genetic composition of white South Africans at large and Afrikaners in particular.

Afrikaners are descended, to varying degrees, from Dutch, German and French Huguenot immigrants, along with minor percentages of other Europeans and indigenous African peoples. The first mixed race marriage which took place in Cape Town in 1664 was that of Krotoa, a Khoi woman, and Peder Havgaard, a Danish surgeon. Krotoa and Peder's descendants are the Pelzer, Kruger, Steenkamp and other Afrikaner families. Although the Cape Colony was administered and initially settled by VOC, a number of foreigners also boarded ships in the Netherlands to settle there. Their numbers can be reconstructed from censuses of the Cape rather than passenger lists, taking into account VOC employees who later returned to Europe. Some Europeans also arrived from elsewhere in Holland's sphere, especially German soldiers being discharged from colonial service. As a result, by 1691 over a quarter of the white population of South Africa was not ethnically Dutch. The number of permanent settlers of both sexes and all ages, according to figures available at the onset of British rule, numbered 26,720, of whom 50% were Dutch, 27% German, 17% French and 5.5% other. This demographic breakdown of the community just prior to the end of the Dutch administration has been used in many subsequent studies to represent the ethnic makeup of modern Afrikaners, a practise criticised by some academics such as Dr. Johannes Heese.

Based on Heese's genealogical research of the period from 1657 to 1867, his study  ("The Origins of the Afrikaners") estimated an average ethnic admixture for Afrikaners of 35.5% Dutch, 34.4% German, 13.9% French, 7.2% non-European, 2.6% English, 2.8% other European and 3.6% unknown. Heese reached this conclusion by recording all the wedding dates and number of children of each immigrant. He then divided the period between 1657 and 1867 into six thirty-year blocs, and working under the assumption that earlier colonists contributed more to the gene pool, multiplied each child's bloodline by 32, 16, 8, 4, 2 and 1 according to respective period. Heese argued that previous studies wrongly classified some German progenitors as Dutch, although for the purposes of his own study he also reclassified a number of Scandinavian (especially Danish) progenitors as German. Drawing heavily on Christoffel Coetzee de Villiers' , British historian George McCall Theal estimated an admixture of 67% Dutch, with a nearly equal contribution of roughly 17% from the Huguenots and Germans. Theal argued that most studies suggesting a higher percentage of German ancestry among Afrikaners wrongly counted as "German" all those who came from German-speaking Swiss cantons and ignored the VOC's policy of recruiting settlers among the Dutch diaspora living in the border regions of several German states.

The degree of intermixing among Afrikaners may be attributed to the unbalanced sex ratio which existed under Dutch governance. Only a handful of VOC employees who sailed from the Netherlands were allowed to bring their families with them, and the Dutch never employed European women in a full-time capacity. Between 1657 and 1806 no more than 454 women arrived at the Cape, as compared to the 1,590 male colonists. One of the most fundamental demographic consequences was that white South African women, much like their counterparts in colonial North America, began to marry much younger and consequently bear more children than Western Europeans. Another was the high occurrence of inter-family marriages from the matrilineal aspect. These were reinforced by the familial interdependence of the Cape's credit and mortgage obligations. Afrikaner families thus became larger in size, more interconnected, and clannish than those of any other colonial establishment in the world. Some of the more common Afrikaner surnames include Botha, Pretorius and van der Merwe. As in other cases where large population groups have been propagated by a relatively small pool of progenitors, Afrikaners have also experienced an increase in the frequency of some otherwise rare deleterious ailments, including variegate porphyria and familial hypercholesterolaemia.

Non-European ancestry 

According to a genetic study in February 2019, almost all Afrikaners have admixture from non-Europeans. The total amount of non-European ancestry - on average - is 4.8%, of which 2.1% are of African ancestry and 2.7% Asian/Native American ancestry. Among the 77 Afrikaners investigated, 6.5% had more than 10% non-European admixture, 27.3% had between 5 and 10%, 59.7% had between 1 and 5%, and 6.5% below 1%. It appears that some 3.4% of the non-European admixture can be traced to enslaved peoples who were brought to the Cape from other regions during colonial times. Only 1.38% of the admixture is attributed to the local Khoe-San people.

Black Afrikaners
Approximately 100 black families who identify as Afrikaners live in the settlement of Onverwacht, established in 1886 near the mining town of Cullinan. Members of the community descend from the freed slaves who had been with the Voortrekkers who settled in the area.

Modern history

Apartheid era 

In South Africa, an Afrikaner minority party, the National Party, came to power in 1948 and enacted a series of segregationist laws favouring White people known as apartheid, meaning "separateness". These laws allowed for the systematic persecution of opposition leaders and attempted to enforce general white supremacy by classifying all South African inhabitants into racial groups. Non-White political participation was outlawed, Black citizenship revoked, and the entire public sphere, including education, residential areas, medical care, and common areas such as public transport, beaches, and amenities, were segregated.

Apartheid was officially abolished in 1991 after decades of widespread unrest by opponents who were seeking equal rights, led by supporters of the United Democratic Front, Pan-African Congress, South African Communist Party, and African National Congress, and a long international embargo against South Africa. The effective end to apartheid, however, is widely regarded as the 1994 general election, the first fully-democratic multi-racial election.

It took place following a long series of negotiations involving the National Party government under President Frederik Willem de Klerk, the ANC under Nelson Mandela, and other parties. The African National Congress won and Mandela was elected as president.

Post-apartheid era 

Efforts are being made by some Afrikaners to secure minority rights. Protection of minority rights is fundamental to the new 1996 post-apartheid Constitution of South Africa. These efforts include the  movement. In contrast, a handful of Afrikaners have joined the ruling African National Congress party, which is overwhelmingly supported by South Africa's Black majority.

Employment Equity legislation favours employment of Black (African, Indian, Chinese and Coloured population groups, White women, disabled people) South Africans over White men. Black Economic Empowerment legislation further favours Blacks as the government considers ownership, employment, training and social responsibility initiatives which empower Black South Africans as important criteria when awarding tenders. However, private enterprise adheres to this legislation voluntarily. Some reports indicate a growing number of Whites living in poverty compared to the apartheid era, and attribute this change to such laws. In 2006 some 350,000 Afrikaners were classified as poor, with some research claiming that up to 150,000 were struggling to survive. This decline among them, combined with a wave of violent crime, has led to many Afrikaners and English-speaking South Africans leaving the country.

In the early 2000s, Genocide Watch theorised that farm attacks constituted early warning signs of genocide against Afrikaners. It criticised the South African government for its inaction on the issue, noting that, since 1991, "ethno-European farmers" (which included non-Afrikaner farmers of European race in their report) were being murdered at a rate four times higher than that of the general South African population. As of the 1996 census, 68,606 out of the 749,637 people in the agriculture and hunting sector were white. Since 1994, close to 3,000 farmers have been murdered in thousands of farm attacks.

Afrikaner diaspora and emigration 

Since 1994, significant numbers of White people have emigrated from South Africa. Large Afrikaner and English-speaking South African communities have developed in the UK and other developed countries. Between 1995 and 2005, more than one million South Africans emigrated overseas, citing the high rate of violent crime. Farmers have also emigrated to other parts of Africa to develop efficient commercial farming there.

Geography

Botswana 

Botswana has a minority group of Afrikaners historically concentrated in the Ghanzi area. In 1898 the British South Africa Company offered land to settlers who moved to the region. Many of them depended upon trading for sustenance. Significant connections between the San people and Afrikaners occurred. Several members of this community rose to high positions in the Botswana government.

Namibia 

There were 133,324 speakers of Afrikaans in Namibia, forming 9.5% of the total national population, according to the 1991 census. The majority identify with the Coloured and Baster communities of colour. Afrikaners are mostly found in Windhoek and in the Southern provinces; they have a population of around 100,000 in Namibia.

Global presence 
A significant number of Afrikaners have migrated to Commonwealth nations such as Canada, the United Kingdom, Australia, and New Zealand. Other popular destinations include the Netherlands, United Arab Emirates, and Hong Kong. Some have also settled in Brazil, Argentina, Mexico, and Qatar.

Numerous young Afrikaners have taken advantage of working holiday visas made available by the United Kingdom, as well as the Netherlands and Belgium, to gain work experience. The scheme under which UK working holiday visas were issued ended on 27 November 2008; this was replaced by the Tier 5 (Youth Mobility) visa. South Africa has been excluded from the working holiday visa programme in the UK, Belgium, Netherlands, and the rest of the EU.

As of 2011, Georgia is encouraging Afrikaner immigration to assist in reviving the country's agriculture industry, which has fallen on hard times. In 2018, there were reports that Russia might welcome 15,000 Afrikaners to southern Russia.

Culture

Religion 

At the time of settlement, Dutch traders and others came out of a majority- Protestant area, where the Reformation had resulted in high rates of literacy in the Netherlands. Boers in South Africa were part of the Calvinist tradition in the northern Europe Protestant countries. The original South African Boer republics were founded on the principles of the Dutch Reformed Church. Missionaries established new congregations on the frontier and churches were the center of communities.

In 1985, 92% of Afrikaners identified as members of the Reformed churches that developed from this background. Pentecostal churches have also attracted new members.

Language 

The Afrikaans language changed over time from the Dutch spoken by the first white settlers at the Cape. From the late 17th century, the form of Dutch spoken at the Cape developed differences, mostly in morphology but also in pronunciation and accent and, to a lesser extent, in syntax and vocabulary, from that of the Netherlands, although the languages are still similar enough to be mutually intelligible. Settlers who arrived speaking German and French soon shifted to using Dutch and later Afrikaans. The process of language change was influenced by the languages spoken by slaves, Khoikhoi, and people of mixed descent, as well as by Cape Malay, Zulu, British and Portuguese. In a 1925 act of Parliament, Afrikaans was given equal status with Dutch as one of the two official languages (English being the second) of the Union of South Africa. There was much objection to the attempt to legislate the creation of Afrikaans as a new language. Marthinus Steyn, a prominent jurist and politician, and others were vocal in their opposition. Today, Afrikaans is recognised as one of the eleven official languages of South Africa, and is the third most common first language in South Africa. In June 2013, the Department of Basic Education included Afrikaans as an African language to be compulsory for all pupils.

Afrikaans is offered at many universities outside of South Africa including in the Netherlands, Belgium, Germany, Poland, Russia and the United States.

Literature 

Afrikaners have a long literary tradition, and have produced a number of notable novelists and poets, including Eugene Marais, Uys Krige, Elisabeth Eybers, Breyten Breytenbach, André Brink, C. J. Langenhoven and Etienne Leroux.

Nobel Prize winner J.M. Coetzee is of Afrikaner descent, although he spoke English at home as a child in Cape Town. He has translated some works from Afrikaans and Dutch into English, but writes only in English.

Arts 

Music is a popular art form among Afrikaners. 'people games') enjoyed popularity in the past, most Afrikaners today favour a variety of international genres and light popular Afrikaans music. American country and western music has enjoyed great popularity and has a strong following among many South Africans. The South African rock band Seether has a hidden track on their album Karma and Effect titled  ("Come With Me"), sung in Afrikaans. There is also an underground rock music movement and bands like the controversial  ('Fuck-off-police-car') have a large following. The television Channel MK (channel) also supports local Afrikaans music and mainly screens videos from the Afrikaans Rock genre. Afrikaner classical musicians include the pianists Wessel van Wyk, Ben Schoeman, and Petronel Malan, and the music departments of the various universities (Pretoria, Stellenbosch, Potchefstroom, Free State) that started as Afrikaans universities still are renowned. In the 20th century, Mimi Coertse was an internationally renowned opera singer. She is also known as African Lieder interpreter by Stephanus Le Roux Marais. The world-renowned UNISA music exams include a section of South African contemporary music, which acknowledges Afrikaner composers. The contemporary musical  ('Us for you'), dealing with the Second Boer War, featured a book by Deon Opperman and a score by Sean Else and Johan Vorster of the band Eden. Afrikaner film musicals flourished in the 1950s and 1960s, and have returned in the 21st century with two popular films, Liefling and Pretville, featuring singers such as Bobby van Jaarsveld, Steve Hofmeyr, and Kevin Leo.

Cuisine 

A typical recipe for  consists of meat (usually roasted in a pan or oven), vegetables such as green beans, roots or peas, and starch such as potatoes or rice, with sauce made in the pot in which the meat is cooked. Afrikaners eat most types of meat such as mutton, beef, chicken, pork and various game species, but the meat of draft animals such as horses and donkeys is rarely eaten and is not part of traditional cuisine.

Afrikaner households often eat combinations such as -and-sausage, meat curry and rice, and even fish and chips (although the latter are bought rather than self-prepared).

Sport 
Rugby, cricket and golf are the most popular sports among Afrikaners. Rugby in particular is considered one of the central pillars of the Afrikaner community. The national rugby team, the Springboks, did not compete in the first two rugby world cups in 1987 and 1991 because of anti-apartheid sporting boycotts of South Africa, but later on the Springboks won the 1995, 2007, and 2019 Rugby World Cups.

 ('farmer/Boer sport') also played a big role in the Afrikaner history. It consisted of a variety of sports like tug of war, three-legged races,  ('tortoise walk') and other games.

Numismatics 
The name Krugerrand was derived from Kruger (after president Paul Kruger) and the rand monetary unit of South Africa.

In April 2007, the South African Mint coined a collectors R1 gold coin commemorating the Afrikaner people as part of its cultural series, depicting the Great Trek across the Drakensberg mountains.

Institutions

Cultural 
The  ("Afrikaans Language and Culture Association"), referred to by its initials, ATKV, promotes Afrikaans language and culture.

 is a youth movement for Afrikaners in South Africa and Namibia with a membership of over 10,000 active members to promote cultural values, maintaining norms and standards as Christians, and being accountable members of public society.

Political 
The vast majority of Afrikaners supported the Democratic Alliance (DA), the official opposition party, in the 2014 general election. The DA is a liberal party and a full member of Liberal International.

Smaller numbers are involved in nationalist or separatist political organisations. The Freedom Front Plus (FF+) is an Afrikaner ethnic political party which lobbies for minority rights to be extended to Afrikaners. The FF+ is also leading the Volkstaat initiative and is closely associated with the small town of Orania. Then-Freedom Front Plus leader Dr Pieter Mulder served as Deputy Minister of Agriculture, Forestry and Fisheries in the Cabinet of President Jacob Zuma from 2009 to 2014.

Very few Afrikaans-speaking white South Africans vote for the ruling ANC. Some prominent Afrikaner ANC politicians include Derek Hanekom, Marthinus van Schalkwyk, Andries Nel, Gert Oosthuizen and Carl Niehaus.

In an online poll of the Beeld newspaper during November 2012, in which nearly 11,000 Afrikaners participated, 42% described themselves as conservative and 36% as liberal.

In the 2019 general elections, the FF+'s support surged in former strongholds of the DA. Senior FF+ member Philip van Staden said that his party had grown significantly in the election due to the DA leader Mmusi Maimane's positions on race and ethnic identity resulting in the estrangement of many Afrikaans-speaking white voters. The party has since gone on to win previous DA wards with concentrated Afrikaner populations.

See also 

 Afrikaners in Zimbabwe
 Afrikaner Calvinism
 Afrikaner nationalism
 Afrikaner-Jews
 Boer
 Cape Dutch
 Huguenots in South Africa
 Afrikaner Argentines

Notes

References

Further reading

Du Toit, André. "No Chosen People: The Myth of the Calvinist Origins of Afrikaner Nationalism and Racial Ideology." The American Historical Review 88, no. 4 (1983): 920–52. doi:10.2307/1874025.
 

 

 Contains details of prominent British and Afrikaner people in the British Empire in Africa.
 South Africa – Poor Whites (Australian Broadcasting Corporation: Foreign Correspondent, transcript)
 The Afrikaners of South Africa. (Strategy Leader Resource Kit: People Profile)
 South Africa (Rita M. Byrnes, ed. South Africa: A Country Study. Washington: GPO for the Library of Congress, 1996.)

 
Dutch diaspora in Africa
Dutch South African
Dutch Cape Colony
Ethnic groups in South Africa
Ethnic groups in Namibia
Ethnic groups in Zimbabwe
Members of the Unrepresented Nations and Peoples Organization
Articles containing video clips